Gregory John Landsman (born December 4, 1976) is an American politician and former educator from Ohio serving as the U.S. representative for  since 2023.

A member of the Democratic Party, Landsman served on the Cincinnati City Council from 2018 to 2022.

Early life and education
Landsman was born and raised in Cincinnati, Ohio to a Jewish family. He earned a bachelor's degree in economic and political science from Ohio University in 1999 and a master's degree in theological studies from Harvard Divinity School in 2004. Governor Ted Strickland appointed Landsman to be his director of faith-based and community initiatives in 2007.

Landsman served as executive director for Strive until December 2015. He then led Preschool Promise, an initiative to make two years of preschool available to all three- and four-year-olds in Cincinnati. Preschool Promise was incorporated into a joint levy with Cincinnati Public Schools, and the levy passed in November 2016.

Cincinnati City Council
Landsman ran for the Cincinnati City Council in 2013 and lost. He ran again in 2017, and was elected to one of the council's seats in the November general election. Landsman was reelected in 2021.

In 2018, Landsman and four other city councilors (P.G. Sittenfeld, Chris Seelbach, Wendell Young, and Tamaya Dennard), known collectively as the "Gang of Five", were found to be discussing city business via text messages. They talked about how to keep the city manager and potentially regain power from the mayor. In March 2019, the Gang of Five agreed to turn over their text messages in order to settle a lawsuit filed by a local anti-tax activist. The text messages were made searchable and posted on the website of the law firm that sued the Gang of Five. No criminal charges were filed.

U.S. House of Representatives

Political positions

Syria 
In 2023, Landsman voted against H.Con.Res. 21, which aimed to direct President Joe Biden to remove U.S. troops from Syria within 180 days.

Elections

2022 
Landsman announced his candidacy in January 2022 and defeated Chabot in the November election by five percentage points.

Caucus memberships 

 New Democrat Coalition

Committee assignments 

 Committee on Small Business
 Committee on Veterans' Affairs
 Subcommittee on Technology Modernization

Electoral history

Personal life
Landsman lives with his wife, Sarah, and their two children in Mount Washington.

References

External links
 Congressman Greg Landsman official U.S. House website
 Greg Landsman for Congress
 
 

|-

1976 births
21st-century American Jews
21st-century American politicians
American Jews from Ohio
Cincinnati City Council members
Democratic Party members of the United States House of Representatives from Ohio
Harvard Divinity School alumni
Jewish American people in Ohio politics
Jewish members of the United States House of Representatives
Living people
Ohio Democrats
Ohio University alumni
Politicians from Cincinnati